Maureen E. Gaffney (born November 5, 1958, in San Diego, California) is an American actress and activist.

Career
Gaffney hosted two of her own television talk shows: Women Aloud! (which was shown on the Comedy Central network) and The Mo Show.

She and friend Kathy Najimy wrote and starred in two Off-Broadway shows, The Kathy and Mo Show: Parallel Lives (1989) and The Kathy and Mo Show: The Dark Side, both of which won Obie Awards.

She appeared in Seasons 4 and 5 of That '70s Show as Joanne Stupak, Bob Pinciotti's girlfriend, had a recurring role in Mad About You and guest starred in Friends. In addition, she appeared in the black comedy about beauty pageants, Drop Dead Gorgeous.

Gaffney appeared on the British television talk show The Full Wax starring Ruby Wax, in which she portrayed American correspondent "Taffy Turner", in the recurring segment "Taffy Turner: Inside America". Gaffney teamed up with Jennifer Saunders in a recurring role as Bo in the sitcom Absolutely Fabulous; in 2004, talks of a spin-off show began but nothing surfaced. She is co-host of the "Women Aloud" radio program on Greenstone Media.

Personal life
Gaffney is an activist for same-sex marriage and has officiated at same-sex marriages as a certified marriage celebrant.

Filmography

Film

Television

Writer
1995: The Kathy & Mo Show: The Dark Side  (TV) (writer)
1994: She TV   (1 episode, 1994) – Episode #1.2 (1994) TV episode (head writer)
1991: The Kathy & Mo Show: Parallel Lives   (TV) (writer)

Producer
1994: Days Like This   (TV) (executive producer)
1992: Women Aloud!   TV series (co-producer) (unknown episodes)

References

External links
 Official Site
 Women Aloud
 
 

1958 births
Living people
American women comedians
Actresses from San Diego
American stage actresses
American film actresses
American television actresses
American television talk show hosts
Comedians from California
Activists from California
20th-century American actresses
20th-century American comedians
21st-century American actresses
21st-century American comedians